The 1851 Michigan gubernatorial election was held on November 4, 1851. Democratic nominee Robert McClelland defeated Whig nominee Townsend E. Gidley with 58.50% of the vote.

General election

Candidates
Major party candidates
Robert McClelland, Democratic
Townsend E. Gidley, Whig

Results

References

1851
Michigan
Gubernatorial
November 1851 events